Luis Puig Palace is an arena in Valencia, Spain.  It is primarily used for indoor sports and hosted the 2008 IAAF World Indoor Championships. The arena also hosts a  painted concrete cycling track which played host to the 1992 UCI Track Cycling World Championships. It has a capacity of 6,500 people.

External links
 information at FixedGearFever.com

Sports venues in Valencia
Velodromes in Spain
Indoor arenas in Spain
2008 IAAF World Indoor Championships
Indoor track and field venues